FC Hakoah, is an association football club based in Zürich, Switzerland. It is a Jewish club.

See also
List of football clubs in Switzerland

External links
 Official Website

Association football clubs established in 1921
Hakoah, FC
Hakoah, FC
Hakoah sport clubs
1921 establishments in Switzerland